Nabinchandra College, established in 1960, is a provincialized government degree college situated at Badarpur, in Karimganj district, Assam. This college is affiliated with the Assam University. The college offers various courses in all the streams namely Humanities, Science and Commerce. It has courses for Higher Secondary under Assam Higher Secondary Education Council(AHSEC) and the graduation courses are affiliated to Assam University, Silchar.

Departments

Science 
Physics
Mathematics
Chemistry
Ecology & Environmental Science
Botany
Zoology

Arts 
Arabic
Urdu
Bengali
English
History
Economics
Political Science

Commerce 
 Accountancy
 Business studies
 Economics or Commercial Mathematics & Statistics. (CMS)

References

External links
http://www.nccollege.ac.in/

Universities and colleges in Assam
Colleges affiliated to Assam University
Educational institutions established in 1960
1960 establishments in Assam